The Milan Triennial V was the first to be held at the , the first recognised by the Bureau of International Expositions and also the first to be a triennial event (having previously been held biennially).

Contents
The Parco Sempione was used to hold 40 temporary pavilions, and a permanent building, the then Torre Littoria, now Torre Branca designed by Gio Ponti.

Displays included mural paintings by De Chirico, Sironi, Campigli and Carlo Carrà

Prizes
The Grand Prix was awarded to 
Elsa Elenius,
Maija Kansanen-Størseth and to
Harry Röneholm (for exhibition display);
Eva Brummer had an honorary mentionl;
Alvar Aalto,
Eva Anttila and 
Toini Muona won gold medals;
Friedl Kjellberg and Werner West silver 
and 
Dora Jung,
Kurt Ekholm,
Gunnel Gustafsson (Nyman) and 
Jussi Mäntynen
all won bronze medals.

References 

1933 in Italy
Tourist attractions in Milan
World's fairs in Milan